Paul McCarthy (born 27 August 1963) is an Irish former rugby union player and coach.

Career
From Cork, McCarthy represented local amateur club Cork Constitution during his career, playing in the newly formed All-Ireland League in the 1990s, and also played for Munster, featuring in the side that famously beat 1991 Rugby World Cup winners Australia in 1992. McCarthy also won five caps for Ireland between 1992 and 1993, and represented the Barbarians.

Outside of rugby, McCarthy was a business development manager for ABB Ireland, which he combined with a part-time scrum coach role with Munster from the 2002–03 season. From the 2010–11 season, McCarthy was appointed Munster's full-time scrum coach, and spent a week with New Zealand's scrum coach Mike Cron, but due to cost cutting by the province, McCarthy's contract with Munster was not renewed at the end of the 2012–13 season, despite McCarthy having earned widespread praise for his work.

References

External links
Munster Profile
Ireland Profile

ESPNScrum Profile

Living people
1963 births
Rugby union players from County Cork
Irish rugby union players
Irish rugby union coaches
Cork Constitution players
Munster Rugby players
Ireland international rugby union players
Barbarian F.C. players
Munster Rugby non-playing staff
Rugby union props